Liga Paraguaya de los Derechos de la Mujer  was a women's organization in Paraguay, founded in 1951.   

It was founded by the leading suffragist Mercedes Sandoval de Hempel in 1951. It was proceeded by Unión Femenina del Paraguay (UFP) (1936–1937) and the Unión Democrática de Mujeres (1946–1947), but was to become the first long time women's organization.  

It played an important role in the struggle for women's suffrage, which was finally introduced in 1961, as the last for any South American nation.

References 

1950s establishments in Paraguay
Feminism and history
Organizations established in 1951
History of Paraguay
Voter rights and suffrage organizations
Women's suffrage in Paraguay
Women's organisations based in Paraguay
Feminist organisations in Paraguay